

The MSrE M-19, also known as the Rubik R-02 after its designer Ernő Rubik, was a sport aircraft built in Hungary in 1937.  Sándor Geönczy initially worked with Rubik on the project, but died before it was completed. The M-19 was a conventional, low-wing cantilever monoplane with a wing of elliptical planform and fixed, tailskid undercarriage. The pilot and passenger sat in tandem under a streamlined canopy that fully enclosed the cockpit, and the main wheels were covered with spats. When the design was finalised, Rubik's calculations were verified by the Aviation Institute in Warsaw and a single prototype contrstucted.

The M-19 was displayed at Budapest's annual International Fair in May 1937, but was involved in a tragedy shortly thereafter. On 1 July, on its second test flight, the aircraft rolled over, killing veteran pilot István Dobos. Rebuilt after the crash, the M-19 was flown for a few more years and participated in a number of international competitions. However, no series production was ever undertaken and the prototype was finally burned at the end of 1942.

Specifications

Notes

References

 
 
 

1930s Hungarian sport aircraft
MSrE aircraft
Rubik aircraft
Low-wing aircraft
Single-engined tractor aircraft
Aircraft first flown in 1937